Jalal Baba Nagar is a major suburb  in Hyderabad, Telangana, India. It is under the jurisdiction of Greater Hyderabad within the Revenue Limits of Attapur and is close to Attapur and Kishan Bagh. This area was a hilly forest and was least inhabited in the past and the famous lake Mir Alam Tank located here and Road No. 9 bypass of National Highway 7 passes through this area.

The suburb's mosque, known as Jama Masjid of Mehmoodia Qutubh Shahi, was built in the period of Qutubh Shah.

Toponymy 

It was named to honour the Sufi Saint Hafiz Jalal Uddin Quadri. Dargah of Hafiz Jalal Baba Situated center of Jalal Baba Nagar

Demographics 
Dakhni Urdu, Telugu is the local language here.

Education

There are many Urdu and English medium situated in Jalal Baba Nagar.

New Moon High School

Bachpan Vikas School

Branch of M.A. Ideal School

Branch of Darul Uloom Anwar Ul Huda

Location 
Hyderabad Deccan railway station is the major station located about 5 km away from Jalal Baba Nagar.

Transport 
TSRTC connects Jalal Baba Nagar to other parts of Hyderabad like Dilkushnagar, Koti, Mehdipatnam, and Shamshabad. The closest MMTS Train station
is at Budvel. This suburb has a good road network, with roads being
and there are a number of various depot buses passing through this route specially Bus route No 94, 94/70, 95/94 are available to reach this area. RTO-RTA-RANGAREDDY(ATTAPUR)-TS-007

References 

Neighbourhoods in Hyderabad, India